The 1979–80 Hong Kong First Division League season was the 69th since its establishment.

League table

References
 1979–80 Hong Kong First Division (RSSSF)

Hong
Hong Kong First Division League seasons
1979–80 in Hong Kong football